Juan Diego Botto Rota (born 29 August 1975) is an Argentine-Spanish film, stage and television actor.

Born in Argentina, he moved to Spain together with his mother (the actress and acting coach Cristina Rota) in 1978. Following early film appearances as a child actor, he landed a breakthrough role in the 1995 film Stories from the Kronen. He has since starred in films such as Martín (Hache) (1997), Plenilune (2000),  Broken Silence (2001), Obaba (2005), Go Away from Me (2006) and Ismael (2013). He has also worked as a stage director and playwright and debuted as a film director with 2022 social drama-thriller On the Fringe.

Early life
His parents were both actors. His father (a member of the Peronist Youth and Montoneros) was kidnapped and murdered in 1977 during the Argentine Dirty War. In 1978, together with his mother and older sister María, he moved to Madrid, Spain, where his little sister, was born. His sisters are both actresses. His mother taught acting classes out of their apartment, before creating her own academy.

He attended high school in New York and lived there for two years.

Career
Botto studied acting at the school founded by his mother in Madrid, which later became the Center for New Creators, based in the Sala Mirador. Later he moved to New York to continue his studies under the direction of Uta Hagen.

His first film appearance was at the age of eight in the film Game of Power, by Fausto Canel (1983).

During the 1980s he played small roles in movies and appeared in the 1990 American television series Zorro. In 1992 he landed a role as the son of Christopher Columbus in the film 1492: Conquest of Paradise, by Ridley Scott. Three years later he starred in the film Stories from the Kronen, by Montxo Armendáriz, in which he achieved great success and popularity.

His role in the 1999 film Sobreviviré (I will survive), about a woman who falls in love with a man who, unknown to her, is homosexual, got him more national and international recognition.

His career has included films such as Martín (hache), by the director Adolfo Aristarain; Broken Silence, by Montxo Armendáriz, Plenilunio, by Imanol Uribe, Asfalto, by Daniel Calparsoro; Go Away from Me, by Víctor García León; Todo lo que tú quieras, by Achero Mañas; as well as several works abroad, such as The Dancer Upstairs, directed by John Malkovich and starring Javier Bardem; Bordertown, by Gregory Nava, starring Jennifer Lopez; The Anarchist's Wife, by Marie Noëlle and Peter Sehr; and El Greco, by Yannis Smaragdis, for which he won the Best Actor Award at the Cairo Film Festival in 2008.

In his professional career he has always combined cinema and theater. He is the coordinator of the Sala Mirador theater.

In 2005 he directed the play El privilegio de ser perro (The Privilege of Being a Dog), written by himself, about the tough life immigrants are subjected to while trying to sneak into and live in a new country. In December 2008, and after a tour throughout Spain, Hamlet premiered at the Theatre of María Guerrero in Madrid, directed and starring him, along with José Coronado, Marta Etura and Nieve de Medina, among others. He is also the author of the plays Despertares y celebraciones, directed by his mother Cristina Rota, and The Last Night of the Plague, directed by Víctor García León.

In 2012 he wrote the play Un trozo invisible de este mundo. The text, which deals with immigration and exile, mixes drama and humor with commitment. In it he acted, directed by Sergio Peris-Mencheta. In 2014 Botto won the Max Theater Awards for Best Actor and Best New Author for this work, which also won the Max Award for Best Play of the year.

He has received numerous cinematographic distinctions. He has been nominated for the Goya Awards four times for his appearances in the films Historias del Kronen, Plenilunio (2000), Vete de mí (2006) and Ismael (2013). His career in the theater has also made him the winner of a Fotograma de Plata Award for best theater actor in 2008 for his participation in Hamlet, as well as two Max Awards and a Cosmopolitan Award.

In the 2010s he participated in the films Silencio en la Nieve (2012), by Gerardo Herrero, Ismael (2013), by Marcelo Piñeyro, Hablar (2015), by Joaquín Oristrell, and La ignorancia de la sangre (2014), by Manuel Gómez Pereira.

From 2016 to 2017, Botto starred in the TNT drama series Good Behavior, playing Javier, a charming hitman with a moral code who crosses paths with Letty (Michelle Dockery), a professional thief. Underneath their cold and calculating work, they both hide a harsh and dark family reality.

In January 2017 he worked on the suspense series Pulsaciones, on Antena 3, where he played Rodrigo Ugarte.

He played General Presidente Silvio Luna in the 2021 DC Extended Universe film The Suicide Squad, directed by James Gunn.

His debut as feature film director is the film On the Fringe, selected for screening at the 79th Venice International Film Festival's Horizons section.

Personal life
Botto currently lives in Madrid with his wife, Spanish journalist and writer Olga Rodríguez. They have a daughter, Salma. He is also active in politics, protesting the 2003 war in Iraq and taking part in a support group for fellow children of the disappeared.

Filmography

Film

Television 
 Zorro as Felipe (Don Diego de la Vega/Zorro's mute servant)
 Lucrecia (1996)
 Augustus (2003, TV movie)
 Good Behavior (2016–2017, TV series)
 Pulsaciones (2017, TV series)
  Instinto (2019)
 White Lines (2020)
 Tales of  the Lockdown ( TV series) (2020)
 Todos mienten (2021, TV series)
 No me gusta conducir (2022, TV series) as Pablo Lopetegui

Music videos 
 Somos Anormales (2017, music video)

Director 
 "Doble moral" (segment of the collective film ; 2004)
 "Gourmet" (episode of the streaming series ; 2020)
 En los márgenes (2022)

Theater 
 El privilegio de ser perro (2008)
 El ultimo dia de la peste (2010)
 Invisibles (2014)
 Una noche Sin Luna (2021)

Accolades

References

External links 
 
 
 The Unofficial Juan Diego Botto Fan Site

1975 births
Living people
Spanish male child actors
Male actors from Buenos Aires
Argentine emigrants to Spain
Argentine male child actors
Spanish male film actors
Spanish male stage actors
Spanish male television actors
Male actors from Madrid
Argentine male film actors
Argentine male stage actors
20th-century Argentine male actors
20th-century Spanish male actors
21st-century Spanish male actors